This is a list of defunct airlines, arranged alphabetically by country within their respective continents.
List of defunct airlines of Africa
List of defunct airlines of the Americas
List of defunct airlines of Asia
List of defunct airlines of Europe
List of defunct airlines of Oceania

See also

IATA airline designator
ICAO airline designator
List of airlines
List of largest airlines
List of low-cost airlines
List of national airlines
List of accidents and incidents on commercial airliners
Airline call sign 
Cargo airline
Airline bankruptcies in the United States

External links

Airlines of North America

Airline-related lists
Airlines, defunct

Airlines Defunct